Candyfreak: A Journey Through the Chocolate Underbelly of America is a non-fiction book written by Steve Almond. It is about a trip that he took in which he searched for candy bars made by small companies. He traveled to factories across the country. It was widely reviewed. It was featured as a "Staff Pick" at Powells.com.
 
On May 24, 2004, shortly after the books publication in print, Highbridge Audio published an audiobook production of Candyfreak, read by Oliver Wyman.

In 2006, Heinemann republished the book in the UK with the revised title Candyfreak: Confessions of a Chocoholic.

References

External links
 

2005 non-fiction books
English-language books
American non-fiction books
Candy
Chocolate